Dutchtown is an unincorporated community located within Montgomery Township in Somerset County, New Jersey, United States. The area consists mainly of forested land with some houses grouped around the intersection of Dutchtown-Zion Road and Belle Meade-Blawenberg Road (County Route 601) in the northern portion of the township. Also nearby are the Unionville Cemetery and a rock quarry. The Dirck Gulick House was added to the National Register of Historic Places in 2003.

References

Montgomery Township, New Jersey
Unincorporated communities in Somerset County, New Jersey
Unincorporated communities in New Jersey